The Heat Can Melt Your Brain is an album by Viva Voce, released on September 14, 2004, on Minty Fresh.

Track listing 
 "Alive With Pleasure"
 "Lesson No. 1"
 "Business Casual"
 "The Lucky Ones"
 "High Highs"
 "Daylight"
 "The Center of the Universe"
 "Free Nude Celebs"
 "Mix Tape = Love"
 "They Never Really Wake Up"

References

2004 albums
Viva Voce (band) albums
Minty Fresh Records albums